Serra Calderona, often referred to as La Calderona is a  long mountain range in the Camp de Túria, Horta Nord and Alt Palància comarcas of the Valencian Community, between the provinces of Castelló and Valencia Spain.

This moderately high range is an eastern prolongation of the Sierra de Javalambre. Its highest point is El Gorgo (907 m). Other important summits are Muntanya del Garbí (600 m) and El Puntal de l' Abella (635 m).

The range was formerly known as Monts de Porta Coeli, after the Carthusian Monastery of Porta Coeli located in the mountains. The name Calderona originated in the seventeenth century when a woman known as María Calderón "La Calderona", one of the favourite mistresses of King Philip IV of Spain, hid in these mountains among the highwaymen.

Olive oil Protected Designation of Origin (PDO)
Together with Serra d'Espadà, a parallel range only 25 km to the north, the Serra Calderona constitutes a defined ecoregion in the foothills of the Iberian System that are closest to the Mediterranean Sea coast. In many areas of the mountainsides olive trees are grown. Their olives produce excellent oil that has been awarded Protected Designation of Origin (PDO) and has been included by the global slow food movement in the Ark of Taste international catalogue of heritage foods in danger of extinction. This oil is marketed as Aceite de las Sierras Espadán y Calderona.

Natural Park
There are numerous caves in these mountains, as well as deep river gorges. Formerly these mountains were a fearful place for travellers, for they were haunted by bandits or highwaymen, known locally as roders. The Natural Park of the Calderona Range is located in the Serra Calderona. Within this well-kept park there are numerous marked paths for hikers.

Features

See also
Sagunto Castle
Serra d'Espadà
Mountains of the Valencian Community

References

External links
La Sierra Calderona 
Parcs Naturals de la Comunitat Valenciana - Official List
Camping in Serra Calderona

Calderona
Alto Palancia
Horta Nord
Camp de Túria
Calderona